Durak (also Romanized as Dūrak) is a village in Mahru Rural District, Zaz va Mahru District, Aligudarz County, Lorestan Province, Iran. At the 2006 census, its population was 31, in 6 families.

References 

Towns and villages in Aligudarz County